Giulio Maria Odescalchi (1612 – 28 August 1666) was an Italian Roman Catholic bishop who served as the Bishop of Novara. He was the brother of Pope Innocent XI.

Innocent XI opened his sainthood cause and this has allowed for him to be known as a Servant of God.

Life
Giulio Maria Odescalchi was born in 1612 in Como to Livio Odescalchi and Paola Castelli Giovanelli. His siblings were Carlo, Lucrezia, Constantino, Nicola and Paolo. His other brother was Benedetto, the future Pope Innocent XI. He is also a relative of Carlo Odescalchi - future Servant of God. His father died in 1626 and his mother died of the plague in 1630.

Pope Alexander VII appointed him as the Bishop of Novara at the behest of Benedetto, who had resigned from that post. Odescalchi served as bishop until his death at the age of 54 in 1666.

Benedetto, elected as Pope Innocent XI, opened the sainthood process for his late brother. This conferred the title of Servant of God upon him.

See also
Odescalchi

References

External links and additional sources
 (for Chronology of Bishops) 
 (for Chronology of Bishops) 

1612 births
1666 deaths
People from Como
17th-century venerated Christians
Italian Servants of God
Bishops of Novara
17th-century Italian Roman Catholic bishops